Norman Wells (Slavey language: Tłegǫ́hłı̨  "where there is oil") is a town located in the Sahtu Region, Northwest Territories, Canada. The town, which hosts the Sahtu Regional office, is situated on the north side of the Mackenzie River and provides a view down the valley of the Franklin and Richardson mountains.

Demographics

A total of 315 people identified as Indigenous, and of these, 195 were First Nations, 80 were Métis, 15 were Inuit and 20 gave multiple Indigenous responses. The main languages in the town are North Slavey and English. Of the population, 78.1% is 15 and older, with the median age being 32.8, slightly less than the NWT averages of 79.3% and 34.0.

History
Oil was first seen by Alexander Mackenzie during his exploration of the river in 1789 but it was not until 1911 that an oil bearing formation was discovered. Imperial Oil, a major employer in the town, was established in the area in 1937 with a refinery built in 1939.

During the Second World War, Norman Wells was deemed important as a source of oil for military operations in Alaska and Yukon. The Canol Road and Canol pipeline project was undertaken to enable the piping of oil to Whitehorse, with the flow starting in 1944. The road, which began at Canol Camp across the river, was abandoned. The Canol Heritage Trail is what remains of the road in the NWT.

The Norman Wells Proven Area Agreement of 1944 is a partnership between Imperial Oil and the federal government (administered by Indigenous and Northern Affairs Canada) that has lasted to this day. The completion of an oil pipeline from Norman Wells to Zama City in 1985 connected to the North American pipeline grid and resulted in increased activity.

Indigenous People
The Norman Wells Metis, a Métis group which is signatory to the Sahtu Dene and Metis Comprehensive Land Claim Agreement, are currently negotiating self-government powers and recently signed a framework agreement towards a new treaty.

Transportation

Norman Wells is accessible by navigating the Mackenzie River in summer, or by driving over the winter ice road, December to March, that connects with Wrigley and Fort Simpson. The most common method of travel into Norman Wells is by air via the Norman Wells Airport and the town is connected with both Yellowknife and Inuvik. Scheduled flights are provided by Canadian North and North-Wright Airways. Beginning in June 2010 and until its amalgamation with Canadian North, First Air offered a scheduled service into the community. In the summer floatplane access to the town is possible at the Norman Wells Water Aerodrome. During the summer months there are barge services, sealifts to the town by Northern Transportation Company Limited from Hay River and Cooper Barging Services from Fort Simpson. Other aviation companies that have a presence in the community include Canadian Helicopters and Discovery Air.

Services
Services include a three-member Royal Canadian Mounted Police detachment and a community health centre with two nurses with dental visits two or three times a year. There is a branch of the Canadian Imperial Bank of Commerce and two grocery stores including the Northern store and Rampart Rentals along with three hotels and two restaurants. Norman Wells also has a liquor store, currently the only one in the Sahtu Region. Phone service is provided by Northwestel with cable television and Internet access available. Mobile phone services are available through Bell Mobility or Northwestel's Latitude Wireless service, which is now owned by Bell. Former member of parliament for the Western Arctic, Ethel Blondin-Andrew, has a consulting service, Mountain Dene Ventures, in the town.

Education
The community is part of the Sahtu Divisional Education Council and they operate, through the Norman Wells District Education Authority, the Mackenzie Mountain School. The school, which has an enrollment of 150, provides education from Junior Kindergarten to Grade 12. Aurora College has a presence in the community with a community learning centre and a career centre.

Climate
Norman Wells has a subarctic climate (Köppen Dfc) with summer lasting for about three months. Although winter temperatures are usually below freezing, every month of the year has seen temperatures above . Rainfall averages  and snowfall . On average, there are 92.9 days, October to April, when the wind chill is below -30, which indicates that frostbite may occur within 10 – 30 minutes. There is an average of 35.9 days, November to April, when the wind chill is below -40, which indicates that frostbite may occur within 5 – 10 minutes.

See also
 List of municipalities in the Northwest Territories

References

External links

NormanWells.com

Communities in the Sahtu Region
Towns in the Northwest Territories
Populated places on the Mackenzie River
Road-inaccessible communities of the Northwest Territories